Nuevo Vigía is a town in the Colón province of Panama.

Sources 
World Gazetteer: Panama – World-Gazetteer.com

population     3

Populated places in Colón Province